Meliboeus is a genus of beetles in the family Buprestidae, the jewel beetles. They are distributed throughout the Palearctic, Afrotropical, and Indomalayan realms. As of 2008, there were 227 species.

Species include:

Species
Meliboeus abessinicus Obenberger, 1919
Meliboeus abimvae Théry, 1940
Meliboeus achardi Obenberger, 1924
Meliboeus adlbaueri Niehuis, 1998
Meliboeus adonis Obenberger, 1919
Meliboeus aeneifrons Deyrolle, 1864
Meliboeus aeneiventris Deyrolle, 1864
Meliboeus aeneopictus Kerremans, 1895
Meliboeus aeneus Kerremans, 1899
Meliboeus aeratus (Mulsant & Rey, 1863)
Meliboeus aethiopicus Kerremans, 1913
Meliboeus albomaculatus Théry, 1937
Meliboeus albopilosus Kerremans, 1899
Meliboeus alfierianus Théry, 1935
Meliboeus algiricus Théry, 1930
Meliboeus alluaudi Théry, 1930
Meliboeus amethystinus (Olivier, 1790)
Meliboeus andrewesi Obenberger, 1922
Meliboeus angolus Bellamy, 1998
Meliboeus angustatus Fisher, 1930
Meliboeus annon (Gory, 1841)
Meliboeus anticerugosus Obenberger, 1944
Meliboeus aureolus (Abeille de Perrin, 1893)
Meliboeus babaulti Théry, 1930
Meliboeus bakeri Kerremans, 1914
Meliboeus bandarensis Obenberger, 1924
Meliboeus belzebuth Obenberger, 1944
Meliboeus berbericus Théry, 1930
Meliboeus biafranus Obenberger, 1921
Meliboeus bicolor Fisher, 1930
Meliboeus bicoloratus Kerremans, 1914
Meliboeus bipartitus Deyrolle, 1864
Meliboeus bipustulatus (Fairmaire, 1901)
Meliboeus birmicola Obenberger, 1922
Meliboeus bisetus (Thunberg, 1827)
Meliboeus borneensis Obenberger, 1919
Meliboeus braunsellus Obenberger, 1935
Meliboeus braunsi Obenberger, 1923
Meliboeus brunneolus Obenberger, 1924
Meliboeus burgeoni Obenberger, 1931
Meliboeus caeruleus (Thunberg, 1789)
Meliboeus callosicollis (Fåhraeus in Boheman, 1851)
Meliboeus carbonicolor Obenberger, 1924
Meliboeus cardinalis Obenberger, 1922
Meliboeus caucasicus Abeille de Perrin, 1896
Meliboeus celebensis Obenberger, 1944
Meliboeus centaureae Obenberger, 1924
Meliboeus chinensis Obenberger, 1927
Meliboeus clavicornis Obenberger, 1922
Meliboeus coelestis Kerremans, 1900
Meliboeus congolanus Kerremans, 1898
Meliboeus conradsi Obenberger, 1940
Meliboeus contortulus Obenberger, 1931
Meliboeus contubernalis (Fåhraeus in Boheman, 1851)
Meliboeus convexithorax Obenberger, 1944
Meliboeus coraeboides (Kerremans, 1892)
Meliboeus corporaali Obenberger, 1932
Meliboeus crassulus Obenberger, 1924
Meliboeus crassus (Gory & Laporte, 1839)
Meliboeus cryptocerus (Kiesenwetter, 1858)
Meliboeus cupreicollis (Walker, 1859)
Meliboeus cuprinus (Gory & Laporte, 1839)
Meliboeus cyaneoscutellatus Bourgoin, 1924
Meliboeus cyaneus (Ballion, 1870)
Meliboeus cyanipennis (Fairmaire, 1903)
Meliboeus cylindricollis (Fåhraeus in Boheman, 1851)
Meliboeus cyprius (Zürcher, 1911)
Meliboeus dapitanus Obenberger, 1924
Meliboeus delareyensis Obenberger, 1935
Meliboeus doddsi Obenberger, 1931
Meliboeus dorsalis Kerremans, 1914
Meliboeus dubitatus Obenberger, 1922
Meliboeus elongatus Kerremans, 1907
Meliboeus episcopalis (Mannerheim, 1837)
Meliboeus exiguus Fisher, 1930
Meliboeus exilis (Roth, 1851)
Meliboeus fahraei Obenberger, 1922
Meliboeus fallator Obenberger, 1919
Meliboeus farinosulus Obenberger, 1935
Meliboeus fasciatus Kerremans, 1899
Meliboeus flammicoxis Obenberger, 1931
Meliboeus fokienicus Obenberger, 1944
Meliboeus fraternus (Fåhraeus in Boheman, 1851)
Meliboeus fulgidicollis (Lucas, 1846)
Meliboeus gerardi Obenberger, 1931
Meliboeus gibbicollis (Illiger, 1803)
Meliboeus gilli Obenberger, 1931
Meliboeus graminis (Panzer, 1789)
Meliboeus haefligeri Kerremans, 1907
Meliboeus hancocksi Théry, 1937
Meliboeus harrarensis Obenberger, 1935
Meliboeus helferi Obenberger, 1922
Meliboeus heydeni (Abeille de Perrin, 1897)
Meliboeus hirsutus Obenberger, 1931
Meliboeus holubi Obenberger, 1922
Meliboeus hoscheki Obenberger, 1916
Meliboeus hottentottus Obenberger, 1931
Meliboeus impressithorax Pic, 1924
Meliboeus indicolus Kerremans, 1892
Meliboeus indignus Obenberger, 1931
Meliboeus insipidus Théry, 1905
Meliboeus insularis Fisher, 1930
Meliboeus insulicolus Fisher, 1935
Meliboeus jakobsoni Obenberger, 1931
Meliboeus jakovlevi Obenberger, 1931
Meliboeus javanicus Obenberger, 1924
Meliboeus kabakovi Alexeev in Alexeev, et al., 1992
Meliboeus kalshoveni Obenberger, 1931
Meliboeus karnyi Obenberger, 1931
Meliboeus kaszabi Cobos, 1966
Meliboeus komareki Obenberger, 1931
Meliboeus kristenseni Obenberger, 1922
Meliboeus kubani Niehuis, 1994
Meliboeus lamottei Descarpentries, 1958
Meliboeus lesnei Théry, 1934
Meliboeus lineolus Obenberger, 1931
Meliboeus macnamarai (Théry, 1930)
Meliboeus makrisi Mühle & Brandl, 2009
Meliboeus malaisei Obenberger, 1940
Meliboeus malvernensis Obenberger, 1931
Meliboeus massaicus Obenberger, 1940
Meliboeus massarti Burgeon, 1941
Meliboeus melanescens Fisher, 1930
Meliboeus melanogaster Obenberger, 1940
Meliboeus miliaris (Gory & Laporte, 1839)
Meliboeus minutus Kerremans, 1893
Meliboeus moghrebicus Théry, 1930
Meliboeus monticolus Fisher, 1935
Meliboeus morawitzi Semenov, 1905
Meliboeus mukiensis Stepanov, 1958
Meliboeus mulanganus Obenberger, 1931
Meliboeus multicolor Fairmaire, 1893
Meliboeus musculus Obenberger, 1931
Meliboeus neavei Obenberger, 1931
Meliboeus nickerli Obenberger, 1922
Meliboeus nigerrimus Kerremans, 1907
Meliboeus nigripennis Deyrolle, 1864
Meliboeus nigrocoeruleus Deyrolle, 1864
Meliboeus nigroscutellatus Obenberger, 1935
Meliboeus nitidiventris Kerremans, 1898
Meliboeus niveiventris Obenberger, 1931
Meliboeus nodifrons (Murray, 1868)
Meliboeus nodosus (Thunberg, 1827)
Meliboeus nonfriedi Obenberger, 1931
Meliboeus notatus (Thunberg, 1789)
Meliboeus orientalis (Abeille de Perrin, 1905)
Meliboeus overlaeti Théry, 1940
Meliboeus parachalceus Obenberger, 1931
Meliboeus parellinus (Fåhraeus in Boheman, 1851)
Meliboeus parvulus Küster, 1852
Meliboeus pilosulipennis Obenberger, 1935
Meliboeus pistor Obenberger, 1931
Meliboeus plexus Kerremans, 1914
Meliboeus potanini Obenberger, 1929
Meliboeus prasinus Obenberger, 1922
Meliboeus pravus Obenberger, 1924
Meliboeus pretoriae Obenberger, 1931
Meliboeus princeps Obenberger, 1927
Meliboeus punctatus Péringuey, 1908
Meliboeus purpuratus (Fåhraeus in Boheman, 1851)
Meliboeus purpureicollis Théry, 1930
Meliboeus purpurifrons Kerremans, 1912
Meliboeus pygmaeolus Obenberger, 1917
Meliboeus pygmaeus (Gory & Laporte, 1839)
Meliboeus rajah Obenberger, 1944
Meliboeus raphelisi Obenberger, 1924
Meliboeus reitteri (Semenov, 1889)
Meliboeus robustus Küster, 1852
Meliboeus romanovi Stepanov, 1958
Meliboeus royi Descarpentries, 1958
Meliboeus ruandensis Théry, 1940
Meliboeus rugosipennis Obenberger, 1916
Meliboeus sacchii Kerremans, 1898
Meliboeus santolinae (Abeille de Perrin, 1894)
Meliboeus scintilla Obenberger, 1931
Meliboeus scotti Théry, 1937
Meliboeus sculpticollis Abeille de Perrin, 1896
Meliboeus semenovi Obenberger, 1931
Meliboeus semenoviellus Obenberger, 1929
Meliboeus sericeomicans Obenberger, 1924
Meliboeus setulosus (Boheman, 1860)
Meliboeus sikkimensis Obenberger, 1922
Meliboeus sinae Obenberger, 1935
Meliboeus sinaiticus Théry, 1935
Meliboeus sinuaticollis Obenberger, 1944
Meliboeus siva Obenberger, 1919
Meliboeus skulinai Obenberger, 1940
Meliboeus solinghoanus Obenberger, 1935
Meliboeus somalicus Kerremans, 1898
Meliboeus splendidiventris Kerremans, 1899
Meliboeus staneki Obenberger, 1935
Meliboeus strandi Obenberger, 1931
Meliboeus strandianus Obenberger, 1922
Meliboeus stupidus Obenberger, 1919
Meliboeus subplanus Obenberger, 1940
Meliboeus substituens Obenberger, 1919
Meliboeus subulatus (Morawitz, 1861)
Meliboeus sulcifrons Bourgoin, 1924
Meliboeus sumatranus Obenberger, 1924
Meliboeus sutor Obenberger, 1931
Meliboeus tchitcherini Obenberger, 1931
Meliboeus tesari Obenberger, 1935
Meliboeus theryi Abeille de Perrin, 1893
Meliboeus tomenticollis Obenberger, 1922
Meliboeus tomentiventris Obenberger, 1935
Meliboeus toroensis Obenberger, 1931
Meliboeus transverserugatus Obenberger, 1935
Meliboeus travancorensis Obenberger, 1924
Meliboeus tribulis (Faldermann, 1835)
Meliboeus trisulcus (Thunberg, 1827)
Meliboeus uzeli Obenberger, 1931
Meliboeus vagecostatus Théry, 1937
Meliboeus vansoni Obenberger, 1935
Meliboeus venustus Kerremans, 1892
Meliboeus violaceipennis Théry, 1941
Meliboeus violaecolor Obenberger, 1932
Meliboeus virens (Thunberg, 1827)
Meliboeus viridanus (Gory & Laporte, 1839)
Meliboeus viridiventris Obenberger, 1940
Meliboeus williami Obenberger, 1935
Meliboeus wittei Théry, 1948
Meliboeus yunnanus Kerremans, 1895
Meliboeus zonatus Kerremans, 1914
Meliboeus zuluanus Obenberger, 1931

References

Buprestidae genera